This is a list of glaciers on Thurston Island, an ice-covered, glacially dissected island,  long,  wide and  in area, lying a short way off the northwest end of Ellsworth Land, Antarctica. It is the third-largest island of Antarctica, after Alexander Island and Berkner Island.

Glaciers 

Thurston Island
Glaciers: Thurston Island
Antarctic: Thurston Island